Onnaman is a 2002 Indian Malayalam-language action drama film written and directed by Thampi Kannanthanam and starring Mohanlal, N. F. Varghese, Biju Menon and Ramya Krishnan. The film features original soundtrack composed by S. P. Venkatesh. Mohanlal's son Pranav makes a guest appearance in the film.

Plot

Ravishanker, who is a street-urchin comes under the patronage of Salim Bhai, a self-styled messiah of the masses and a don too. When Ravishankar grows up, he becomes an adviser to Salim Bhai. With the help of his gang of young friends, Ravishankar soon emerges as a leader of the poor and the oppressed. Naturally, the 'bad' guys led by Gulab Chand Shah, resent him and do everything possible to eliminate Ravishankar.

Cast

Mohanlal as Ravishankar (Ravi)
Pranav Mohanlal as young Ravishankar
N. F. Varghese as Salim Bhai
Biju Menon as ACP Vishnu S. Pillai
Ramya Krishnan as District Collector Kamala IAS
Lalu Alex as R.D.O Hari, Ravi's brother
Jagathy Sreekumar as Vasu
Jagadish as Krishnankutty
Vijayakumar as Balan
Hemanth Ravan as CI Martin 
Narendra Prasad as Sukumaran Menon, Ravi's father
Jayabharathi as Parvathy, Ravi's mother
Aswathi Menon as Radha, Ravi's sister
Dr. Sharmila as Latha, Ravi's Sister-in-law
Kavya Madhavan as Raziya, Bhai's daughter
Tej Sapru as Gulab Chand Shah
Shehzad Khan as City Police Commissioner Karunakaran
Suresh Krishna as Ramanaik
Arun Ghosh as Sandeep, Gulab Chand Shah's son
Baburaj as Prathapan
P. Sreekumar as Minister Sudhakaran
Vinayakan as Suresh, Ravi's friend
Major Ravi as D.Y.S.P. Peethambaran
Tini Tom as S.I. Chandrappan
Ravi Menon as Gopalan Mesthiri
Saju Kodiyan as Ajayan, Ravi's friend
Fathima Babu as Deepa Martin
Chali Pala as Tharakan
James Stalin as Rafi
Abu Salim as Karthikeyan
Kollam Ajith as Jeevan
Ponnamma Babu as Raziya, Sainaba's mother
Rajesh Rajan
Manuraj
Harisree Martin 
Haneef Kumaranellur
Deepika Mohan

Soundtrack
The songs of this film were composed by S. P. Venkatesh.

Release

References

External links
 

2000s Malayalam-language films
2002 films
2002 action drama films
Indian action drama films
Films directed by Thampi Kannanthanam